Leoš Pípa (born September 30, 1971) is a Czech former professional ice hockey right winger

Pípa played in the Czechoslovak First Ice Hockey League and the Czech Extraliga for HC Dukla Jihlava from 1990 to 2000. He played 281 games for the team in total and won a league championship in 1991. He also won the Danish League championship with Esbjerg in 2004 and the Latvian League championship with HK Riga 2000 in 2004.

References

External links

1971 births
Living people
Chamonix HC players
HSC Csíkszereda players
Czech ice hockey right wingers
Czechoslovak ice hockey right wingers
HC Dukla Jihlava players
EfB Ishockey players
GKS Tychy (ice hockey) players
Herning Blue Fox players
HC Morzine-Avoriaz players
HK Riga 2000 players
Sportspeople from Jihlava
HC Tábor players
Czech expatriate ice hockey players in Switzerland
Czech expatriate sportspeople in France
Expatriate ice hockey players in France
Czech expatriate sportspeople in Romania
Expatriate ice hockey players in Romania
Czech expatriate sportspeople in Denmark
Expatriate ice hockey players in Denmark
Czech expatriate sportspeople in Latvia
Expatriate ice hockey players in Latvia
Czech expatriate sportspeople in Poland
Expatriate ice hockey players in Poland